Sporomega is a genus of fungi within the Rhytismataceae family.

References

External links 

 Sporomega at Index Fungorum

Leotiomycetes